Ramkarpal Singh s/o Karpal Singh  (born 9 April 1976) commonly referred to as Ramkarpal Singh, is a Malaysian politician and lawyer who has served as the Deputy Minister in the Prime Minister's Department in charge of Law and Institutional Reforms in the Pakatan Harapan (PH) administration under Prime Minister Anwar Ibrahim and Minister Azalina Othman Said since December 2022 and the Member of Parliament (MP) for Bukit Gelugor since May 2014. He served as Chair of the Consideration of Bills Select Committee from July 2019 to 2020. He is a member of Democratic Action Party (DAP), a component party of the Pakatan Harapan (PH) opposition coalition. He is one of the sons of the late Karpal Singh and younger brother of Damansara MP and former Minister of Communications and Multimedia Gobind Singh Deo and Member of the Penang State Executive Council (EXCO) and Member of the Penang State Legislative Assembly (MLA) for Datuk Keramat Jagdeep Singh Deo.

Education 
Ram was educated in Penang, first at St. Xavier's Institution and then Seri Inai School (now Tenby International School). He earned his Bachelor of Laws from the University of Bristol in the UK and was called to the bar by Gray's Inn.

Politics 
After the death of his father Karpal, Ram was elected as the MP for Bukit Gelugor constituency. He was the only Pakatan Rakyat's candidate for the 2014 Bukit Gelugor by-election. He won the Bukit Gelugor by-election with 37,659 votes majority. He was sworn as MP on 10 July 2014. He retained his Bukit Gelugor seat by an even larger 55,951-vote majority in the 2018 General Elections, when his coalition, Pakatan Harapan (PH), successfully defeated the incumbent Barisan Nasional (BN) to form the government.

On 18 July 2019, Ramkarpal was selected as chair of the Consideration of Bills Select Committee, replacing Permatang Pauh MP Nurul Izzah Anwar.

Legal career 
He was admitted to the Malaysian bar in 2000. Currently, he heads his late father's law firm in Pudu Lama, Kuala Lumpur.

Ramkarpal defended People's Justice Party (PKR) leader Anwar Ibrahim in his second sodomy criminal charge in the High Court however his verdict was overturned by the Court of Appeal.

Death of Karpal Singh 
Ramkarpal was travelling with his father from his Pudu office to Penang when the accident happened. According to Ram, his father was asleep before the fatal crash took place, claiming the life of Karpal and his personal aide, Michael Cornelius Selvam.

Election results

See also
 2014 Bukit Gelugor by-election
 Bukit Gelugor (federal constituency)
 List of Malaysian politicians of Indian origin

References

1976 births
Living people
People from Penang
Democratic Action Party (Malaysia) politicians

21st-century Malaysian lawyers

Malaysian politicians of Indian descent
Malaysian Sikhs
Malaysian people of Punjabi descent
Members of the Dewan Rakyat
Alumni of the University of Bristol
Members of Gray's Inn
21st-century Malaysian politicians